Gölbaşı is a town and district of the Ankara Province in the Central Anatolia region of Turkey,  south of the city of Ankara. According to a 2010 census, the population of the district is 95,109, 93,852 of whom live in the town of Gölbaşı.
The district includes the Mogan and Eymir lakes.

Although the lakes are polluted and infested with mosquitoes, the picnic areas and lakeside restaurants of Gölbaşı serve as a popular retreat from the city for the people of Ankara. A number of government departments have accommodations here, and the town is slowly but surely joining up with the city as the green space between the two disappears. Türk Telekom have their satellite ground control in the area.

History
Archaeological research in the area has revealed occupation since 3000 BC by a succession of civilısations including Early Bronze Age, Hittites, Phrygians, Romans, and Byzantines. Excavated sites include Selametli, Tuluntaş, Tuluntaş-Ortaçayır, Kızılcaşar-Gökçepınar, Karagedik, Bacılar, Bezirhane Kültepe, Bezirhane-Kepenekçi and İncek-Harmantepe.

The area has long been occupied by Turks, and it was here that Timur hid his elephants in the woods before the Battle of Ankara.

Places of interest
 Tulumtaş caves -  from Ankara,  of limestone cave with stalagmites and stalactites
 Gölbaşı Ground Station, satellite telecommunication center of Türksat
 Turkish Satellite Assembly, Integration and Test Center operated by the Turkish Aerospace Industries (TAI)

Demographics 

The population of Gölbaşı city is growing very fast. The main reasons are: a high natural growth rate, migration from rural areas (rural exodus) and immigration from the city of Ankara.

Administrative divisions

Neighborhoods

Villages

Notes

References

External links
 District governor's official website 
 District municipality's official website 

 
Populated places in Ankara Province
Districts of Ankara Province
Towns in Turkey